The Men's Individual Sprint event at the 2010 South American Games was held over March 19–20. The qualifications were held on the first day and quarterfinals, semifinals and finals on the following day.

Medalists

Results

Qualification

Quarterfinals

Semifinals

Finals

Final 5–8

Finals

References
Qualification
Quarterfinals

Sprint M
Men's sprint (track cycling)